The 2017 Selangor FA Season was Selangor FA's 12th season playing soccer in the Malaysia Super League since its inception in 2004.

Selangor FA began the season on January 21, 2017. They will also compete in two domestic cups, the Malaysia FA Cup and Malaysia Cup.

Season Overview

Pre-season

(Squad Build and First Transfers)

Selangor started the summer in December when P. Maniam was officially announced as its new coach for one season. He appeared for his first press conference with the media on December 28. K. Gunalan, last year's interim coach, will again serve as assistant coach for this season.
 
On December 28, 2016, P. Maniam added some new faces to the club's academy after losing several key players who moved to other teams. The players who were promoted to the first team were A. Namathevan, K. Kannan, Amirul Ashraf, Faizzudin Abidin, Badrul Amin, K. Sarkunan and Syahmi Safari.

On December 30, Dato' Seri Mohamed Azmin Ali quit as president of the Football Association of Selangor(FAS), after having held the post for two years beginning in December 2014. Amirudin Shari also joined Azmin by resigning as team manager. They made this decision after seeing the failure of Selangor's executive officers(EXCO FAS) to submit a strategic plan for Selangor's state football management, including failing to update the professional administration organization for the FAS association.

During the pre-season planning, P. Maniam also added some new local players for the season. Among them are: Afiq Azmi (Negeri Sembilan), Halim Zainal (Kuala Lumpur), K. Satish (PKNS), Fairuz Abdul Aziz (AirAsia FC) and Nurshamil Abd Ghani, a player who is on loan from Melaka United.

On December 6, S. Subramaniam was released by Selangor. Azmi Muslim left the club on the same day, and was transferred to PKNS FC after three years with the Red Giants. Hazwan Bakri and R. Gopinathan were sold to Johor Darul Ta'zim for a fee of RM1 million (Malaysian ringgit), while Nazmi Faiz had already signed an agreement to join JDT when he was with Selangor FA last season. The following day, Shahrom Kalam, and Hafiz Kamal switched sides and joined Perak this season for an undisclosed fee, while Hadi Yahya joined them on a free transfer.
 
P. Maniam also added new foreign players from Liberia and Romania, Francis Forkey Doe and Victoraș Astafei to replace foreign players from last season, Mauro Olivi and Patrick Wleh, whose contracts were not renewed for the current season. Patrick Wleh returned to PKNS FC following the end of his loan spell after Selangor decided not to make the loan move a permanent deal. Mauro Olivi has been released after not being offered a new contract.
 
Selangor agreed on a contract extension with import defender Ugo Ukah, keeping him with the club for one more year. Quota imports from Asia, Andik Vermansyah still remains with the team, with a year left on his contract. However, he sustained an ACL injury forcing Andik to rest for 5–6 months causing him to be dismissed from the team for this season. Import player Asia status will be filled by Timor-Leste players, Juliano Mineiro, who will replace him  temporarily after signing a six-month contract.

Mid-season 
(Second Transfers)

On second transfers day, Selangor reached an agreement with Melaka United on 17 May for AFC Cup winner Amri Yahyah, who re-joined the team for an undisclosed fee. Two days later, Selangor announced Victoraș Astafei will be released to make way for the original import, Andik Vermansyah, who will take Astafei's place until the end of the season.

On 9 June, before the second transfer window closed, Selangor officially signed a new import player from Spain, Rufino Segovia, to replace Juliano Mineiro, whose contract expired at the end of the month.

Pre-season and Friendlies Match

Selangor announced their first fixture of the 2017 pre-season schedule on 25 December 2016. On 29 December, Selangor began its pre-season campaign against Sime Darby at the training field in Shah Alam. The match finished as a goalless draw.

The next fixture, Selangor visited PDRM on 6 January at PULAPOL, Kuala Lumpur. Selangor won the match 2–1, with goals from K. Kannan and Forkey Doe. Victory against PDRM is the first pre-season win for the team.

Five days later, Selangor faced Terengganu, last season's Super League relegation team, at Selayang Stadium. Selangor won the match 2–0, with goals from two import trials,  Mohamed Talaat and Kamil Poźniak.

The next day, Selangor continued their friendly matches against a club from the FAM league (third division), MOF FC. Selangor won 1–0, with a goal scored by import trials, Tiago Chulapa. It was the Red Giants' third victory after four friendly matches.

Selangor meet Kuala Lumpur for the next game on 14 January at SUK field in Shah Alam, which Kuala Lumpur won 1–0 with a goal scored by Kuala Lumpur import trials, Carlos Chamorro.

In the final matchday of the pre-season, Selangor faced another FAM league club, Petaling Jaya Rangers on the SUK field. The Red Giants lost again, 1–0, thanks to a goal from a local player, Badrul Afendy. It was the team's second defeat in six friendly matches.

Overall, Selangor finished the pre-season friendlies with 2 wins, 1 draw and 2 defeats.

January

On 21 January, Selangor officially kicked off its Super League campaign, playing at home to Penang. Maniam fielded a 3–4–3 formation, while playing a style of defending and attacking football. Selangor went on to win the match 2–0, with goals from Adam Nor Azlin and Forkey Doe, ensuring Maniam got off to a winning start.

On 27 January, Selangor was unable to progress up the table, recording a 1–1 home draw against Melaka United. Although there was a goal from Selangor's new import signings, Victoraș Astafei, one goal from Melaka United player, Khairu Azrin held Selangor to a draw.

February

On 4 February, despite one goal from Syahmi Safari and two goals from Forkey Doe, Selangor came up short with a 5–3 away defeat to PKNS. This was their first defeat in the league after three games.

Their next away game, against defending champions Johor Darul Ta'zim, ended goalless as well meaning Selangor were down in eighth place.

On 14 February, in the first FA Cup match against Negeri Sembilan, Selangor were eliminated at home with 3–4 penalty shoot-out, after the match finished as a goalless draw 0–0 (including extra-time).

Three days later, in their fifth match of the league campaign, Selangor recorded a 3–1 home win against Felda United, following three goals from Astafei, Raimi Mohd Noor and Juliano Mineiro ensured the Red Giants side the victory.

On 24 February, Selangor FA (FAS) finally found a new president, Datuk Seri Subahan Kamal, who replaced former chief Dato' Seri Mohamed Azmin Ali who stepped down from the post before the start of the season.

On 25 February, Selangor faced Kelantan in an away game, which had ended 0–2 to Selangor. A brace from Mineiro helped collect another three points. That results meant Selangor climbed to third place at the end of the month.

March

Selangor started the new month at home with a 1–1 draw against Kedah. Sandro opened the scoring for the visitors, before Selangor equalized the score with a late goal from Mineiro.

In the last match in March, Selangor suffered their first defeat at home, after a 0–1 loss against Perak. On the league table, Selangor were down to fifth place.

April

After the international break, Selangor continued their league match on 8 April with a narrow 2–1 victory against Sarawak at home, which saw Selangor climb up to fourth place. The two goals were scored by Astafei and Forkey Doe.

On 15 April, Selangor went against Pahang as visitors. And with goals from Mineiro and Forkey Doe, the match ended up in a draw with the final result being 2–2.

Selangor visited T–Team on 26 April, the next match day, and lost 0–1, with a goal from Fauzi Abdul Kadar in the 89th minute. That result means Selangor has finished their first round in the league with 4 wins, 4 draws and 3 defeats.

May

On 8 May, Selangor began the second round in the league as visitors with a 1–1 draw against Sarawak. The goal Selangor goal was scored by Rizal Fahmi, after Sarawak player Mateo Roskam opened the scoring.

On May 24, Selangor continued its winless streak—no wins in four matches in a row— after losing to Pahang 2–0 at home. Two goals from striker import visitors, Matheus Alves at the 74th and 83rd minutes ensured victory for Pahang. The defeat saw Selangor drop down to fifth place before the league break during the month of Ramadan.

On 22 May, Selangor were drawn into Group D of the Malaysia Cup alongside Johor Darul Ta'zim, Sarawak, and Terengganu.

July

After a one-month break, Selangor opened July, and continued their league match, against T–Team at home. The Red Giants won the thrilling encounter 4–2 thanks to goals from Forkey Doe, Rufino Segovia and a double from Syahmi Safari. Dilshod Sharofetdinov and Yannick N'Djeng scored for T–Team.

On 4 July, Selangor opened their Malaysia Cup campaign, against Terengganu at home. The match ended in a 1–1 draw with goals by Rufino Segovia (43rd minute) for Selangor and Issey Nakajima-Farran (64th minute) for Terengganu.

In the second matchday of the Malaysia Cup group stage on 8 July, they visited Sarawak State Stadium to face Sarawak. The Red Giants was able to squeeze out a 1–2 win after goals from Forkey Doe and one own goal from Sarawak players, Dzulazlan Ibrahim. Sarawak's goal was scored by Shreen Tambi. This was their first win in the current season's Malaysia Cup campaign.

Three days later, Selangor's second game of July in the Super League saw the Red Giants visiting Perak for an away game. A goal from Forkey Doe was all that was required for Selangor to collect three points in a 0–1 win. Despite winning, they also get a less agreeable results, by collecting nine yellow cards and one red card (Andik had been sent off).

For the next league game on 15 July, Selangor visited Kedah. The Red Giants came home without victory after a 1–1 draw at Darulaman Stadium, with only one goal each from S. Veenod (Selangor) and Ken Ilsø (Kedah).

On 18 July, Selangor played the matchday third of Malaysia Cup campaign against Johor Darul Ta'zim at home. Goals from Fairuz Abdul Aziz and a brace by Amri Yahyah gave the Red Giants a comfortable 3–2 win. With this victory, Selangor moved to the top spot in Group D, leaving JDT behind with 3 points difference.

Selangor played their 17th Super League match at home on 22 July and won 1–0 against Kelantan, with the only goal scored by Amri Yahyah. The Red Giants set a new record for the season by maintaining five wins and two draws after seven matches (including the Malaysia Cup match).

On 26 July, Selangor's seven-match unbeaten streak came to an end as they lost to FELDA United 3–1 at Tun Abdul Razak Stadium. The Red Giants goal was scored by Forkey Doe.

Taking on Terengganu at the fourth matchday of the Malaysia Cup campaign, Selangor was able to get a narrow 3–2 victory, with goals from Forkey Doe, Syahmi Safari and Rufino Segovia. With this victory, the Red Giants booked their spot in the quarter final two matchdays before the group stage finished.

August

On 2 August, Selangor suffered their first Malaysia Cup loss of the season with a 2–1 loss at home against Sarawak. A goal from Ugo Ukah was not enough to secure the victory.

Back to the Super League, Selangor took on Johor Darul Ta'zim at home. Despite an early goal by Natxo Insa in the first half, Amri Yahyah and Andik Vermansyah scored in the second half to give Selangor a 2–1 victory. Despite being defeated by the Red Giants, JDT was crowned Super League champion that night, after their closest rival, Kedah, lost to Pahang 2–1. After this, the league took a month-long break to give way for the Malaysian national squad and the under-22 international friendly matches, and the 2017 SEA Games football matches.

September

On 9 September 2017, in the last match of the group stage against Johor Darul Ta'zim, Selangor lost 3–1 despite a goal from Rufino Segovia, which resulted in the team finishing second in the group stage of the Malaysia Cup. The next day, in the draw for the quarter-finals of the Malaysia Cup, Selangor faced Kedah once again.

Selangor lost 2–3 to Kedah in the first leg of the 2017 Malaysia Cup quarter-final on 15 September. Rufino Segovia scored the Red Giants' two goals.

On 20 September, Selangor lost their third game in row after being defeated at home by fierce rival PKNS with a scoreline of 1–2. Shahrul Azhar Ture, Patrick Wleh (PKNS) and Rufino Segovia provided the goals.

On 24 September, Selangor lost 1–0 in the quarter-finals of the Malaysia Cup against Kedah in the second leg, which meant the Red Giants bade farewell to the Malaysia Cup after being unable to break down a resilient Kedah backline.

Selangor suffered their fifth loss in a row on 27 September as they were out-played by Melaka United in a 2–1 away defeat, despite Rufino's second-half goal, his 8th goal for the team this season. On the league table, that result means Selangor were down to sixth place.

October

In their last match of the season against Penang on 28 October, Selangor were able to get a 3–1 victory after goals from Andik Vermansyah and a brace from Rufino. That win meant the Red Giants finished 6th in the league table.

Kit
Supplier: Lotto / Sponsor: Selangor

Players

First Team Squad

† Player left the club during the season.

Reserve Team Squad (call-up)

Transfers

First Transfers
31 October 2016 – 22 January 2017

Transfers in

Transfers out

Second Transfers 
15 May – 11 June 2017

Transfers In

Transfer Out

Pre-season and friendlies

Selangor FA friendlies

Friendly Match 1

Friendly Match 2

Friendly Match 3

Friendly Match 4

Friendly Match 5

Friendly Match 6

Competitions

Overall

Overview

Malaysia Super League

Table

Results summary

Results by round

Selangor FA Results
Fixtures and Results of the Malaysia Super League 2017 season.

Malaysia Super League

Results overview

FA Cup

Malaysia  Cup
Selangor joined the competition in the group stage.

Group stage

Knockout phase

Quarter-finals

Statistics

Squad statistics
 

Appearances (Apps.) numbers are for appearances in competitive games only including sub appearances.\
Red card numbers denote: Numbers in parentheses represent red cards overturned for wrongful dismissal.

† Player left the club during the season.

Goalscorers
Includes all competitive matches.

 

† Player left the club during the season.

Clean sheets

Disciplinary record

† Player left the club during the season.

References

Malaysian football clubs 2017 season
Selangor FA